Angela Paxton is an American politician from the state of Texas. A Republican, she has represented District 8 in the Texas Senate since 2019.

Paxton worked as a guidance counselor at Legacy Christian Academy in Frisco, Texas.

Paxton is married to Ken Paxton, the controversial Texas Attorney General.

She won her state senate seat, in 2018, by defeating fellow Republican Phillip Huffines in the primary and Democrat Mark Phariss in the general election.

Election history

2018

Sponsored legislation 
Paxton introduced Senate Bill 860, which would allow her husband Ken Paxton, the Texas Attorney General, the power to issue exemptions from securities regulations. Billed as a consumer protection effort, the proposal would allow approved individuals to serve as investment advisers without registering with the state board. Paxton said the bill to change state securities law "has literally nothing to do" with a criminal case charging her husband Ken Paxton with defrauding investors.

References

External links
 Campaign website

 Angela Paxton at Texas Tribune

Living people
Year of birth missing (living people)
Place of birth missing (living people)
Democratic Party Texas state senators
21st-century American politicians
Women state legislators in Texas
21st-century American women politicians